The Iridium Controversy is the sixth studio album by Birdsongs of the Mesozoic, released on September 16, 2003 by Cuneiform Records.

Track listing

Personnel 
Adapted from The Iridium Controversy liner notes.

Birdsongs of the Mesozoic
 Michael Bierylo – guitar, sampler, programming, floor tom
 Ken Field – saxophone, flute, percussion
 Erik Lindgren – grand piano, organ, washboard
 Rick Scott – synthesizer, piano, percussion
Additional musicians
 Larry Dersch – drums and percussion (2, 3, 5, 8, 12)
 Terry Donahue – djembe and percussion (2, 3, 5, 8, 12)
 Roger Miller – piano (6, 12)
 Eric Paul – drums (1, 11)
 Ken Winokur – percussion

Production and additional personnel
 Birdsongs of the Mesozoic – production, engineering, recording
 Roger Dean – cover art, illustrations
 Mark Donahue – mastering
 Rich Durkee – mixing
 Claire Folger – photography
 Diane Menyuk – design

Release history

References

External links 
 The Iridium Controversy at Discogs (list of releases)
 The Iridium Controversy at Bandcamp

2003 albums
Birdsongs of the Mesozoic albums
Cuneiform Records albums